The 2009 Northern Colorado Bears football team represented the University of Northern Colorado in the 2009 NCAA Division I FCS football season. The Bears were led by fourth-year head coach Scott Downing and played their home games at Nottingham Field. They were a member of the Big Sky Conference. They finished the season 3–8 overall and 1–7 in the Big Sky to place in a three-way tie for fifth.

Schedule

References

Northern Colorado
Northern Colorado Bears football seasons
Northern Colorado Bears football